The Brandon City Council is the governing body for the city of Brandon, Manitoba, Canada. The council consists of the mayor and 10 ward councillors.

Current Brandon City Council
As of the 2022 Manitoba municipal elections
Mayor, Jeff Fawcett
Assiniboine Ward 1 Councillor, Heather Karrouze
Rosser Ward 2 Councillor, Kris Desjarlais
Victoria Ward 3 Councillor, Barry Cullen
University Ward 4 Councillor, Shaun Cameron
Meadows-Waverly Ward 5 Councillor, Greg Hildebrand 
South Centre Ward 6 Councillor, Bruce Luebke
Linden Lanes Ward 7 Councillor, Shawn Berry
Richmond Ward 8 Councillor, Jason Splett
Riverview Ward 9 Councillor, Glen Parker
Green Acres Ward 10 Councillor, Tyson Tame

See also
List of mayors of Brandon, Manitoba

References

External links
City of Brandon, Manitoba website

Municipal councils in Manitoba
Politics of Brandon, Manitoba